Ronald James Rydalch (born January 1, 1952) is a former professional American football player who played defensive tackle for six seasons for the Chicago Bears. He signed with the Houston Texans of the WFL before being picked up by the Bears during the 1975 season.

References 

1952 births
Living people
People from Tooele, Utah
Players of American football from Utah
American football defensive tackles
Utah Utes football players
Chicago Bears players
American people of Slavic descent